Ram Naresh Rawat (7 May 1962 – 4 September 2022) was an Indian politician and a member of 17th Legislative Assembly, Uttar Pradesh of India. He represented the ‘Bachhrawan’ constituency in Rae Bareli district of Uttar Pradesh.

Political career
Ram Naresh Rawat contested Uttar Pradesh Assembly Election as Bharatiya Janata Party candidate and defeated his close contestant Shahab Sharan from Indian National Congress with a margin of 22,309 votes.

Posts held

References

1962 births
2022 deaths
Uttar Pradesh MLAs 2017–2022
Bharatiya Janata Party politicians from Uttar Pradesh
People from Barabanki, Uttar Pradesh